Ron Samuels is an American film producer and artist manager. His film production credits include Iron Eagle (1986), Aces: Iron Eagle III (1992), and Raven Hawk (1996).

Career
Samuels owned a television production company in Beverly Hills, California bearing his name. In addition to having Lynda Carter as a former management client in the 1970s, he represented other television stars, including actress Lindsay Wagner of The Bionic Woman fame as well as American stuntman Evel Knievel and Spanish-American actress/comedian Charo.

In 1985, Samuels, who had at that time, under a contract to Tri-Star Pictures, via Ron Samuels Productions, for a two-to-three film picture deal, made its film producing debut with the film Iron Eagle.

Personal life
Samuels was married to actress Lynda Carter from May 28, 1977, to February 1, 1982. He is married to Rachel McLish, an actress and former Ms. Olympia.

Filmography
 Jane Doe
 Ravenhawk
 Iron Eagle IV
 Aces: Iron Eagle III
 Iron Eagle II
 Iron Eagle
 Infiltrator
 Downtown
 Scruples
 The Incredible Journey of Dr. Meg Laurel
 The Two Worlds of Jenny Logan
 Callie and Son
 The Last Song
 Born to Be Sold
 Hotline
 A Different Affair
 Woman of the 21st Century
 Today’s Women Heroes
 Four Music-Variety Specials

Artist management

 Rachel McLish
 Lindsay Wagner
 Lynda Carter
 Jaclyn Smith
 Kate Jackson
 Janine Turner
 Charo
 Evel Knievel
 Melissa Gilbert
 Mary Hart
 Deidre Hall
 Robert Conrad
 Jennifer O'Neil
 Lisa Whelchel
 Kari Michaelsen
 Shelly Fabares
 Jaye P. Morgan
 Kathy Smith
 Thelma Camacho

References

External links
 

Film producers from California
American Jews
Living people
People from Rancho Mirage, California
Place of birth missing (living people)
Year of birth missing (living people)